KIDJ (106.3 FM) is a commercial radio station located in Sugar City, Idaho, broadcasting to the Idaho Falls area. KIDJ airs a news/talk format, formerly originated from KID (590 AM).

References

External links

IDJ
Radio stations established in 1986
1986 establishments in Idaho
News and talk radio stations in the United States